The Polish Radio Symphony Orchestra is a Polish radio orchestra founded in 1945 in Warsaw by Stefan Rachoń. Initially, the orchestra made records only for Polish radio and television. In 1970, the orchestra began to tour and release recordings, particularly of Polish music such as that of Wojciech Kilar, Zygmunt Krauze and others.

Musical Directors 
 Stefan Rachoń (1945—1976)
 Wlodzimierz Kamirsky (1976—1980)
 Ian Prushak
 Mieczyslaw Nowakowski
 Tadeusz Strugala
 Wojciech Raisky
 Łukasz Borowicz (2007—2015)
 Michał Klauza (since 2015)

References 
 The Ludwig Van Beethoven Association
 Predan Voigt

External links 
 Official site

Polish cinema composers
Polish orchestras
Radio and television orchestras
1945 establishments in Poland
Musical groups established in 1945